is a 1958 black-and-white Japanese film directed by Bin Kato.

Cast 
 Raizo Ichikawa as Gennosuke Matsudaira
 Kaoru Yachigusa		
 Tamao Nakamura		
 Michiko Ai

References

External links 
  http://www.raizofan.net/link4/movie3/kenpo.htm
 

Japanese black-and-white films
1958 films
Daiei Film films
1950s Japanese films